The 1969–70 Inter-Cities Fairs Cup was the 12th Inter-Cities Fairs Cup. The competition was won by Arsenal over two legs in the final against Anderlecht. It was the first of Arsenal's two European trophies, the other being the European Cup Winners' Cup in 1993–94.

First round

|align=right|Las Palmas ||align=center|0–1||align=left| Hertha BSC||align=center|0–0||align=center|0–1
|-
|align=right|Juventus ||align=center|5–2||align=left| Lokomotiv Plovdiv||align=center|3–1||align=center|2–1
|-
|align=right|Lausanne-Sport ||align=center|2–4||align=left| Győr||align=center|1–2||align=center|1–2
|-
|align=right|Barcelona ||align=center|6–0||align=left| B 1913||align=center|4–0||align=center|2–0
|-
|align=right|Hansa Rostock ||align=center|3–2||align=left| Panionios||align=center|3–0||align=center|0–2

|align=right|Slavia Sofia || align=center|3–1||align=left| Valencia||align=center|2–0||align=center|1–1

|align=right|Dinamo Bacău ||align=center|7–0||align=left| Floriana||align=center|6–0||align=center|1–0

|align=right|Aris ||align=center|1–4||align=left| Cagliari||align=center|1–1||align=center|0–3
|-
|align=right|Sabadell ||align=center|3–5||align=left| Club Brugge||align=center|2–0||align=center|1–5
|-
|align=right|Partizan  ||align=center|2–3||align=left| Újpest||align=center|2–1||align=center|0–2

|}

First leg

Second leg

Liverpool won 14–0 on aggregate.

Juventus won 5–2 on aggregate.

Internazionale won 4–0 on aggregate.

Dinamo Bacău won 7–0 on aggregate.

The game was abandoned after Cagliari's third goal because three Greek players refused to return to the pitch after they were expelled by the police. UEFA ruled the 3–0 score as final.

Cagliari won 4–1 on aggregate.

Napoli won 3–2 on aggregate.

Slavia Sofia won 3–1 on aggregate.

Vitória de Setúbal won 7–2 on aggregate.

Porto won 4–1 on aggregate.

Sporting CP won 6–2 on aggregate.

Newcastle United won 3–1 on aggregate.

Vitória de Guimarães won 2–1 on aggregate.

Second round

|align=right|Győr ||align=center|2–5||align=left| Barcelona||align=center|2–3||align=center|0–2

|-
|align=right|Kilmarnock ||align=center|4–3||align=left| Slavia Sofia||align=center|4–1||align=center|0–2
|- 
|align=right|Skeid ||align=center|0–2||align=left| Dinamo Bacău||align=center|0–0||align=center|0–2

|align=right|Club Brugge ||align=center|5–5 (a)||align=left| Újpest||align=center|5–2||align=center|0–3

|}

First leg

Second leg

Southampton won 8–4 on aggregate.

Hertha BSC won 3–1 on aggregate.

Internazionale won 4–2 on aggregate.

Dinamo Bacău won 2–0 on aggregate.

Carl Zeiss Jena won 3–0 on aggregate.

Napoli won 1–0 on aggregate.

Newcastle United won 1–0 on aggregate.

Arsenal won 3–0 on aggregate.

Vitória de Setúbal won on the away goals rule.

Third round

|align=right|Barcelona ||align=center|2–3||align=left| Internazionale||align=center|1–2||align=center|1–1
|-
|align=right|Kilmarnock ||align=center|1–3||align=left| Dinamo Bacău||align=center|1–1||align=center|0–2

|align=right|Carl Zeiss Jena ||align=center|4–0||align=left| Újpest||align=center|1–0||align=center|3–0

|}

First leg

Second leg

Hertha BSC won 2–1 on aggregate.

Dinamo Bacău won 3–1 on aggregate.

The game was abandoned in the 33rd minute due to low visibility and fog. It was replayed.

Internazionale won 3–2 on aggregate.

The game was originally scheduled for 7 January, but was postponed due to fog in Amsterdam.

Ajax won 4–1 on aggregate.

Quarter-finals

|align=right|Dinamo Bacău ||align=center|1–9||align=left| Arsenal||align=center|0–2||align=center|1–7  

|}

First leg

Second leg

Internazionale won 2–1 on aggregate.

Arsenal won 9–1 on aggregate.

Semi-finals 

|}

First leg

Second leg

Anderlecht won 2–1 on aggregate.

Final 

|}

First leg

Second leg

Arsenal won 4–3 on aggregate.

External links 
 Inter-Cities Fairs Cup results at Rec.Sport.Soccer Statistics Foundation

2
Inter-Cities Fairs Cup seasons